Ferron Presbyterian Church and Cottage (also known as the American Legion Hall) is a historic Presbyterian church at Mill Road and 3rd West in Ferron, Utah.

The Gothic Revival style building was constructed in 1908 as a Presbyterian church and school by the Christian Endeavor Society. The building was added to the National Register of Historic Places in 1978. It is now an American Legion Hall.

References

Defunct schools in Utah
Buildings and structures in Emery County, Utah
Gothic Revival church buildings in Utah
Presbyterian churches in Utah
Churches on the National Register of Historic Places in Utah
Churches completed in 1908
National Register of Historic Places in Emery County, Utah
1908 establishments in Utah